Ilya Nikiforov (born 11 May 1970, Leningrad) is a Russian lawyer, founding member and Managing partner at Egorov Puginsky Afanasiev & Partners Law Offices, former lecturer at the Department of Civil Law at Saint Petersburg State University School of Law.

Professional career

Ilya Nikiforov has over 25 years of invaluable experience.

International Chamber of Commerce (ICC): Arbitration Commission Member, Expert of Russian National Committee.

International Bar Association (IBA): Arbitration Committee Vice-Chair (2008–2009), Secretary (2006–2008).

The London Court of International Arbitration (LCIA): European Users' Council, Councillor (2013 -).

Swedish Arbitration Association (SAA):  Member of Executive Committee 

International Arbitration Court at Belarusian Chamber of Commerce and Industry: Recommended Arbitrator 

Singapore International Arbitration Centre (SIAC): Member of Panel of Arbitrators 

Russian Arbitration Association (RAA): Member of Board 

Vienna International Arbitral Centre (VIAC): included in the List of Practitioners 

KCAB International: Member of Panel of Arbitrators 

The Court of International Commercial Arbitration: included in the List of Arbitrators 

He was also a member of the Commission for Human Rights of the Association of Lawyers of Russia and the editorial board of the journal "Treteyskiy Sud".

Publications

It is surprising how the successful lawyers not only perform a brilliant practical work but also succeed in the scientific research. Ilya Nikiforov is an example of such a lawyer.
 
Contributed to production of Russian versions of IBA Rules on the Taking of Evidence in International Arbitration; IBA Guidelines on Conflicts of Interest in International Arbitration; Russia Arbitration Guide 

Examples of writings in English: 
Chapter "International Commercial Arbitration Practice in the Russian Federation" in International Commercial Arbitration Practice: 21st Century Perspectives, ed. Glenn Hendrix, 2020
Russian Law Deskbook (RLD). Russia Corporate, Financial, and Commercial Law, ed. Scott Alexander Shostak, 2018
"Panorama of World Case Law – Russia", in: The Paris Journal of International Arbitration, 2010-2018 
"Russia", IBA Arbitration Guide, 2017 
"Russia", in: Arbitration World, The European Lawyer Reference Series, ed. W. Rowley, 3rd ed., 2010 
"Interpretation of Article V of the New York Convention by Russian Courts – Due Process, Arbitrability, and Public Policy Grounds for non-Enforcement", in: Journal of International Arbitration, Vol. 25, No 6, December 2008
 
Prominent books (in Russian): 
Contracts for construction under the FIDIC rules: practical use and interpretation, co- author with Lukas Klee, 2016 
The UNCITRAL arbitration rules 2010 (with the new paragraph 4 of article 1 adopted in 2013): Workbook, 2015 
Commentary to the Arbitration Rules of the Leading Arbitral Institutions / ed. R. Chlup (ed.), 2012) 
Civil law: Textbook / ed. A. Sergeev. Moscow, 2018 
International Commercial Arbitration: Textbook / O. Skvortsov, M. Savranskiy, G. Sevastianov (eds). St. Petersburg, Moscow, 2018

Honors and awards

Ilya Nikiforov holds a distinct place in the Best Lawyers rating. It is said that a talented person is talented in everything, therefore it is not a wonder that he has been recommended for a record-breaking 16 practice areas. 

Regarded as Thought Leader - Arbitration 2020 (Who's Who Legal) 

Was awarded the Medal of Order for Merit to Fatherland, II Degree for long-term diligent work and efforts to strengthen the rule of law and protect the rights and interests of citizens by the President of Russian Federation 

Was awarded the Order of the Federal Chamber of Lawyers of the Russian Federation «For loyalty to attorney’s duty»

References

1970 births
Living people
Lawyers from Saint Petersburg
20th-century Russian lawyers
21st-century Russian lawyers